Taraxia subacaulis is a species of evening primrose known by the common name diffuseflower evening primrose. It is native to the western United States, where it grows in several habitat types, especially in mountainous areas. It is a fleshy perennial herb growing from a taproot and usually lacking a stem. The leaves are lance-shaped to oval and up to 22 centimeters long and are borne on long petioles. The flower has yellow petals, each up to 1.5 centimeters long, and a large, bulbous stigma tip. The fruit is a leathery capsule 1 to 3 centimeters long.

External links
Jepson Manual Treatment
Photo gallery

Onagraceae
Plants described in 1813